Abdou Jammeh  (born 13 February 1986) is a Gambian professional footballer.

Career
Jammeh previously played for FC Torpedo Moscow in the Russian First Division. He signed for Torpedo in early 2008, following the relegation of his previous side FC Tekstilshchik-Telekom Ivanovo to the Russian Second Division, and having previously spent two years in Tunisia with ES Zarzis.
In September 2011, Jammeh sign for Kazma in Kuwaiti Premier League.

International career
Jammeh is also a member and captain of the Gambia national football team with 32 caps.

International goals
Scores and results list Ethiopia's goal tally first.

References

1986 births
Living people
Gambian footballers
FC Torpedo Moscow players
Expatriate footballers in Russia
Lierse S.K. players
Challenger Pro League players
Expatriate footballers in Tunisia
The Gambia international footballers
Expatriate footballers in Belgium
ES Zarzis players
Expatriate footballers in Kuwait
Al-Shamal SC players
FC Tekstilshchik Ivanovo players
PKNS F.C. players
Qatari Second Division players
Association football defenders
Kazma SC players
Al-Fahaheel FC players
Kuwait Premier League players
Gambian expatriate sportspeople in Kuwait
Gambian expatriate sportspeople in Qatar
Gambian expatriate sportspeople in Tunisia
Gambian expatriate sportspeople in Russia
Gambian expatriate sportspeople in Belgium
Expatriate footballers in Qatar
People from Bakau